Kevin Brown (born 18 February 1992) is an American bandy player, playing professionally in clubs in Sweden for many years. He played with Ljusdals BK for six years.

Career

Club career
Brown is a youth product of Gustavsberg and has represented their senior team and Ljusdal, and Peace & Love City.

International career
Brown grew up in Sweden but choose to represent United States national bandy team.
He was part of the United States national bandy team in the 2015 and 2016 Bandy World Championship

International Team stats: 10 Games, 11 goals

Debut: WC 2015 Russia, Usa-Lattvia 5–2 Bandy in the United States

Footnotes

References

External links

American bandy players
Ljusdals BK players
Borlänge-Stora Tuna BK players
Elitserien (bandy) players
1992 births
Living people